John Eoin MacMenamin (born 25 November 1952) is an Irish judge who was a judge of the Supreme Court of Ireland between 2012 and 2022. He was previously a judge of the High Court from 2004 to 2012 and a barrister.

Early career
MacMenamin was born in Dublin in 1952 and educated at Terenure College. He studied history at University College Dublin, where he was involved with the UCD L&H. He subsequently attended the King's Inns. He was called to the Bar in 1975, and became a Senior Counsel in 1991. He was a council member of the Free Legal Advice Centres while studying. While working at a FLAC centre in Tallaght, he spoke to the mother of a young defendant who had not had representation and initiated contact with other lawyers on the matter which eventually led to the case State (Healy) v Donoghue. The case established a constitutional right to legal aid in criminal cases.

At the bar, he had a mixed practice, with an emphasis on administrative law, defamation and commercial law. He represented the Sunday Independent in a libel case taken by Proinsias De Rossa and again in the first blasphemy case taken since the country's foundation in Corway v. Independent Newspapers. He was a legal adviser to the Medical Council of Ireland and was involved in a long-running case involving neurosurgery at Beaumont Hospital, Dublin.

He appeared for several clients at the Mahon Tribunal and for the Department of Education at the Laffoy Commission.

He was Chairman of the Bar Council from 1997 to 1999. During his tenure, there was an increase in the fees paid to barristers taking part in the criminal legal aid scheme, following a dispute between the government and the barristers. He was a member of the board of the VHI between 1995 and 1997.

Judicial career

High Court
He was appointed a Judge of the High Court in 2004 on the same day as future Supreme Court colleagues Frank Clarke and Elizabeth Dunne. He presided primarily over judicial review and constitutional cases. He was a member of the Special Criminal Court from 2009. Towards the end of his time at the High Court he was the Judge-in-Charge of the Minors' List, dealing with sensitive cases involving children.

Supreme Court
He was appointed to the Supreme Court in March 2012.

In January 2020, he marched in Warsaw, Poland, with other senior judges from across Europe arising out of issues surrounding the 2015 Polish Constitutional Court crisis. He carried letters of solidarity from the Association of Judges of Ireland.

MacMenamin retired in November 2022.

Personal life
He married Lia O’Hegarty, a lawyer, in 2004, in Rome. They have one daughter.

He was formerly involved with Fine Gael, working as speechwriter for Taoiseach Garret FitzGerald and a lead adviser to Michael Noonan during the 2002 general election.

References

1952 births
Living people
Irish barristers
Judges of the Supreme Court of Ireland
Alumni of University College Dublin
People from County Dublin
High Court judges (Ireland)
Alumni of King's Inns